Chiti, Iran may refer to:
Chiti, Fars or Jiti, a village in Khesht Rural District, Khesht District, Kazerun County, Iran
Chiti, Khuzestan or Qal‘eh Chītī, a village in Sadat Rural District, Central District, Lali County, Iran
Chiti, Lorestan, a village in Zalaqi-ye Gharbi Rural District, Besharat District, Aligudarz County, Iran